Freenet is a pioneering anonymous peer-to-peer distributed data store

Freenet may also refer to:

 Freenet (Central Asia), certain national internet structures in Central Asia
 Free-Net, a text-based community computer network which offers limited Internet services, at little or no cost, is also known as a "free-net"
 Wireless community network, the term "freenet" is commonly used to refer to "free networks".
 Freenet AG, a German telecommunication company
 National Capital FreeNet, a community organization internet service provider in Ottawa
 Freenet (ISP) New Zealand's first free internet service provider
 Freenet (radio), a Personal Mobile Radio system in Germany